WorldPop is a research programme based in the School of Geography and Environmental Science, University of Southampton. The programme employs a multidisplinary team of researchers, analysts, GIS technicians and project specialists who construct open data on populations and population attributes at high spatial resolution. Created from a combination of The AfriPop Project, AmeriPop and AsiaPop projects in 2013, WorldPop engages in geospatial demographic projects with governments and institutions in low- and middle-income countries (LMICs) as well as collaborations with partner organisations, such as the Bill & Melinda Gates Foundation, Gavi, the Vaccine Alliance, United Nations agencies, the UK Foreign, Commonwealth and Development Office, commercial data providers and other international development organisations. The programme provides training in population modelling to ministries of health and national statistical offices in LMICs and works with them to support health and demographic surveys to achieve Sustainable Development Goals

Areas of interest
 Demography
 Geographic information system data
 Satellite imagery
 Remote sensing
 Effects of Non-pharmaceutical intervention (epidemiology) on COVID-19
Geospatial predictive modeling

Population Estimation
WorldPop develops statistical population modelling methods to produce gridded population estimates that support census activities. The programme develops new methods for data synthesis that use demographic and health surveys, census, satellite imagery, cell phone and other data to create consistent gridded outputs and map detailed population densities. These methods are subjected to peer review and many of the output datasets are published as open access in the journal Scientific Data.

A case study evaluating several geospatial datasets against the 'gold-standard' census data for Bioko Island, Equatorial Guinea found that while the WorldPop Constrained dataset for the area matched best at lower population densities, WorldPop Unconstrained data performed poorly at all densities.

Population of Papua New Guinea
Although the government of Papua New Guinea had estimated the country's population at 9.4 million, unpublished findings of a population estimation study funded by the United Nations Population Fund and conducted by WorldPop in November 2022 suggested the true population is close to 17 million.

WorldPop Database
Outputs from WorldPop research contributes to a spatial database of linked information on contemporary census data, satellite-imagery derived settlement maps and land cover information. The resultant API, datasets, methods and maps are available under Creative Commons license on the project's websites. Through collaboration with Esri, gridded population datasets produced by WorldPop are also available in the ArcGIS Living Atlas of the World

See also
Developing country
World Population
Malaria Atlas Project

References

External links
 WorldPop—official website
 WorldPop Open Population Repository—access to gridded population estimates and related data.
 WorldPop Applications—access to WorldPop's interactive web map, do-it-yourself gridded population estimate tool and demographics portal.

Demographics
Covariance and correlation
Bayesian statistics
Sustainable Development Goals
Open access (publishing)